Thomas Jaekel (some sources say Jaeckel, born 21 February 1959) is a German lightweight rower. He won a gold medal at the 1985 World Rowing Championships in Hazewinkel with the lightweight men's four.

References

1959 births
Living people
German male rowers
World Rowing Championships medalists for West Germany